James Chan Soon Cheong (born 26 July 1926) is a Malaysian prelate in the Roman Catholic Church. Born in Selama, Perak, he was ordained a priest on 9 August 1959. He was appointed Bishop of Melaka-Johor on 22 December 1972. His episcopal ordination took place on 8 June 1973. He retired at the age of 75 years on 10 December 2001.

See also 
Roman Catholic Diocese of Malacca-Johor

References

1926 births
20th-century Roman Catholic bishops in Malaysia
Living people
People from Perak
Bishops appointed by Pope Paul VI